MKS Sparta Złotów is the sports club of the Polish town Złotów, since 1928.
The club provides seven sections: 
 Soccer - The junior and senior men's team play in provincial league. The women's team formerly played in the Ekstraliga, Poland's highest league. 
 Volleyball - The women's team plays in the Polish national third league, Seria B, first league. 
 Badminton
 Athletics
 Table tennis
 Boxing
 Aikido

Sparta, in past years, was a famous club with a very good ice hockey team. The most famous sportsmen, Paulina Maj, Wanda Wiecha (volleyball), Jakub Wawrzyniak (soccer), were national teams players.

References

Multi-sport clubs in Poland
Złotów County
Sport in Greater Poland Voivodeship